The 39th Chess Olympiad (39-ya Shakhmatnaya olimpiada), organised by FIDE and comprising an open and a women's tournament, as well as several other events designed to promote the game of chess, took place from September 19 to October 4, 2010 in Khanty-Mansiysk, Russia. There were 148 teams in the open event and 115 in the women's event. In total, 1306 players were registered.

This was the fourth time Russia organized the Chess Olympiad after 1956 (Soviet Union), 1994, and 1998. Six cities had submitted bids to organize the Olympiad: Khanty-Mansiysk, Budva, Buenos Aires, Poznań, Riga, and Tallinn. The selection was part of the FIDE Congress held during the 37th Chess Olympiad in Turin in 2006.

The main events in both competitions were held in indoor tennis courts, which opened in September 2008.

Both tournament sections were officiated by international arbiter Sava Stoisavljević (Serbia). For the second time, the number of rounds of the Swiss system was 11 with accelerated pairings. Both divisions were played over four boards per round, with each team allowed one alternate for a total of five players. The final rankings were determined by match points. In the event of a draw, the tie-break was decided by 1. Deducted Sonneborn-Berger; 2. Game points; 3. Deducted sum of match points.

The time control for each game permitted each player 90 minutes their first 40 moves and 30 minutes for the rest of the game, with an additional 30 seconds increment for each player after each move, beginning with the first. The rule introduced at the previous Olympiad, according to which no draws by agreement were permitted before 30 moves, was once again abolished.

Open event

The open division was contested by 148 teams representing 141 nations. Russia, as hosts, fielded no less than five teams, whilst the International Braille Chess Association (IBCA), the International Physically Disabled Chess Association (IPCA), and the International Committee of Silent Chess (ICSC) each provided one squad. Senegal were signed up, but did not turn up for their first round match and were disqualified.

Ukraine, led by Vasyl Ivanchuk and former FIDE Champion Ruslan Ponomariov, took their second title after 2004. Once again, the Russian hosts were the pre-tournament favourites but, for the fourth Olympiad in a row, failed to live up to expectations, although they came close this time. Captained by former World Champion Vladimir Kramnik, the Russians trailed the Ukrainians by one point before the last round. When Ukraine and eventual bronze medallists Israel, led by Boris Gelfand, drew their final match, Russia had the opportunity to snatch the gold. They only drew as well, however, so in the end had to settle for silver.

Although the Russian "A" team disappointed its fans on its home turf, the "B" squad, with five Olympic debutants, exceeded expectations by finishing sixth. Captain Ian Nepomniachtchi won an individual bronze medal on the top board.

Defending champions Armenia had to settle for seventh place and Team United States for ninth. India was once again without reigning World Champion Viswanathan Anand and finished 18th, while his opponent in the recent championship match, Veselin Topalov, led Bulgaria to 31st place. Another former great power of chess, England, also disappointed in 24th place. The number one player in the world, Magnus Carlsen, only scored 4½ points in 8 games, and his Norwegian team ended up in 51st place.

Due to financial disagreements with the national federation, the top German players did not show up. Seriously weakened, Team Germany came recorded an all-time low in 64th place, just below the team of physically impaired players. Incidentally, the IPCA team were led by Thomas Luther, a former four-time Olympian for the German team.

{| class="wikitable"
|+ class="nowrap" |Open event
! # !! Country !! Players !! Averagerating !! MP !! dSB
|-
| style="background:gold;"|1 ||  || Ivanchuk, Ponomariov, Eljanov, Efimenko, Moiseenko || 2737 || 19 || 
|-
| style="background:silver;"|2 ||  || Kramnik, Grischuk, Svidler, Karjakin, Malakhov || 2755 || 18 ||
|-
| style="background:#cc9966;"|3 ||  || Gelfand, Sutovsky, Smirin, Rodshtein, Mikhalevski || 2676 || 17 || 367.5
|-
| 4 ||  || Leko, Almási, Polgár, Berkes, Balogh || 2698 || 17 || 355.5
|-
| 5 ||  || Wang Yue, Wang Hao, Bu Xiangzhi, Zhou Jianchao, Li Chao || 2703 || 16 || 362.0
|-
| 6 ||  "B" || Nepomniachtchi, Alekseev, Vitiugov, Tomashevsky, Timofeev || 2702 || 16 || 355.0
|-
| 7 ||  || Aronian, Akopian, Sargissian, Pashikian, Grigoryan || 2698 || 16 || 345.0
|-
| 8 ||  || Shirov, Vallejo Pons, Salgado Lopez,Magem Badals, Alsina Leal || 2658 || 16 || 332.0
|-
| 9 ||  || Nakamura, Kamsky, Onischuk, Shulman, Hess || 2691 || 16 || 315.5
|-
| 10 ||  || Vachier-Lagrave, Fressinet, Tkachiev, Édouard, Feller || 2681 || 16 || 311.5
|}
{| class="wikitable mw-collapsible mw-collapsed" style="text-align: left;" width="600px"
! Rank !! Country !! Average rating !! MP !! dSB !! GP
|+ class="nowrap" |Final Ranking - Open
|-
| 11 ||  || 2662 || 15 || 346.5 ||
|-
| 12 ||  || 2694 || 15 || 333.0 || 
|-
| 13 ||  "C" || 2665 || 15 || 320.5 || 
|-
| 14 ||  || 2659 || 15 || 307.5 || 
|-
| 15 ||  || 2665 || 15 || 305.0 || 
|-
| 16 ||  || 2596 || 15 || 302.5 || 
|-
| 17 ||  || 2590 || 15 || 290.5 || 
|-
| 18 ||  || 2645 || 15 || 287.0 || 
|-
| 19 ||  || 2519 || 15 || 257.5 || 
|-
| 20 ||  || 2656 || 14 || 338.5 || 
|-
| 21 ||  || 2583 || 14 || 316.5 || 
|-
| 22 ||  || 2590 || 14 || 302.5 || 
|-
| 23 ||  || 2652 || 14 || 299.0 || 
|-
| 24 ||  || 2673 || 14 || 292.0 || 
|-
| 25 ||  || 2587 || 14 || 281.0 || 
|-
| 26 ||  || 2511 || 14 || 277.0 || 
|-
| 27 ||  || 2535 || 14 || 274.0 || 
|-
| 28 ||  || 2580 || 14 || 265.0 || 
|-
| 29 ||  || 2550 || 14 || 259.5 || 
|-
| 30 ||  || 2637 || 13 || 316.0 || 
|-
| 31 ||  || 2693 || 13 || 287.5 || 
|-
| 32 ||  || 2585 || 13 || 284.5 || 
|-
| 33 ||  || 2609 || 13 || 278.0 || 
|-
| 34 ||  || 2572 || 13 || 277.0 || 
|-
| 35 ||  || 2545 || 13 || 268.0 || 
|-
| 36 ||  || 2485 || 13 || 264.5 || 
|-
| 37 ||  || 2492 || 13 || 264.0 || 
|-
| 38 ||  || 2516 || 13 || 263.0 || 
|-
| 39 ||  "D" || 2492 || 13 || 258.0 || 
|-
| 40 ||  || 2489 || 13 || 257.5 || 
|-
| 41 ||  || 2537 || 13 || 252.0 || 
|-
| 42 ||  || 2481 || 13 || 251.5 || 
|-
| 43 ||  || 2483 || 13 || 236.0 || 
|-
| 44 ||  || 2516 || 13 || 231.0 || 
|-
| 45 ||  || 2501 || 13 || 230.0 || 
|-
| 46 ||  || 2384 || 13 || 227.0 || 
|-
| 47 ||  || 2002 || 13 || 202.5 || 
|-
| 48 || ICSC || 2394 || 13 || 197.0 || 
|-
| 49 ||  || 2572 || 12 || 285.0 || 
|-
| 50 ||  || 2552 || 12 || 276.0 || 
|-
| 51 ||  || 2594 || 12 || 274.5 || 
|-
| 52 ||  || 2587 || 12 || 272.0 || 
|-
| 53 ||  || 2500 || 12 || 261.0 || 
|-
| 54 ||  || 2475 || 12 || 255.0 || 
|-
| 55 ||  || 2502 || 12 || 253.0 || 
|-
| 56 ||  || 2524 || 12 || 246.5 || 
|-
| 57 ||  || 2419 || 12 || 231.5 || 
|-
| 58 ||  || 2393 || 12 || 231.0 || 
|-
| 59 ||  || 2456 || 12 || 218.0 || 
|-
| 60 ||  || 2394 || 12 || 215.0 || 
|-
| 61 ||  || 2286 || 12 || 211.5 || 
|-
| 62 ||  || 1970 || 12 || 194.5 || 
|-
| 63 || IPCA || 2403 || 12 || 192.5 || 
|-
| 64 ||  || 2534 || 11 || 268.0 || 
|-
| 65 ||  || 2513 || 11 || 258.5 || 
|-
| 66 ||  || 2574 || 11 || 254.5 || 
|-
| 67 ||  || 2423 || 11 || 248.5 || 
|-
| 68 ||  || 2350 || 11 || 231.5 || 
|-
| 69 ||  || 2472 || 11 || 224.0 || 
|-
| 70 ||  "E" || 2449 || 11 || 220.0 || 
|-
| 71 ||  || 2422 || 11 || 216.5 || 
|-
| 72 ||  || 2557 || 11 || 214.0 || 
|-
| 73 ||  || 2335 || 11 || 200.0 || 
|-
| 74 ||  || 2338 || 11 || 194.5 || 
|-
| 75 ||  || 2459 || 11 || 194.0 || 
|-
| 76 ||  || 2418 || 11 || 193.0 || 
|-
| 77 ||  || 2343 || 11 || 188.0 || 
|-
| 78 ||  || 2195 || 11 || 187.5 || 
|-
| 79 ||  || 2330 || 11 || 186.0 || 
|-
| 80 ||  || 2332 || 11 || 185.5 || 
|-
| 81 ||  || 2429 || 11 || 184.5 || 
|-
| 82 ||  || 2342 || 11 || 179.0 || 
|-
| 83 ||  || 2429 || 11 || 175.5 || 
|-
| 84 ||  || 2327 || 11 || 165.0 || 
|-
| 85 ||  || 2424 || 10 || 219.0 || 
|-
| 86 ||  || 2436 || 10 || 218.0 || 
|-
| 87 ||  || 2285 || 10 || 206.5 || 
|-
| 88 ||  || 2365 || 10 || 202.0 || 
|-
| 89 ||  || 2273 || 10 || 195.5 || 
|-
| 90 ||  || 2314 || 10 || 191.5 || 
|-
| 91 ||  || 2272 || 10 || 176.0 || 
|-
| 92 ||  || 2325 || 10 || 172.0 || 
|-
| 93 ||  || 2256 || 10 || 168.5 || 21
|-
| 94 ||  || 2165 || 10 || 168.5 || 20½
|-
| 95 ||  || 2251 || 10 || 168.0 || 
|-
| 96 ||  || 2221 || 10 || 166.5 || 
|-
| 97 ||  || 2279 || 10 || 162.5 || 20½
|-
| 98 ||  || 2152 || 10 || 162.5 || 19
|-
| 99 ||  || 2214 || 10 || 160.5 || 
|-
| 100 ||  || 2180 || 10 || 157.0 || 
|-
| 101 ||  || 1464 || 10 || 153.0 || 
|-
| 102 || IBCA || 2346 || 10 || 145.5 || 
|-
| 103 ||  || 2363 || 9 || 183.0 || 
|-
| 104 ||  || 2088 || 9 || 169.0 || 
|-
| 105 ||  || 2243 || 9 || 160.0 || 
|-
| 106 ||  || 1938 || 9 || 158.5 || 
|-
| 107 ||  || 2096 || 9 || 152.5 || 
|-
| 108 ||  || 2224 || 9 || 151.0 || 
|-
| 109 ||  || 2227 || 9 || 149.0 || 
|-
| 110 ||  || 2252 || 9 || 143.0 || 
|-
| 111 ||  || 1950 || 9 || 141.5 || 
|-
| 112 ||  || 1894 || 9 || 133.0 || 
|-
| 113 ||  || 2069 || 9 || 132.0 || 
|-
| 114 ||  || 2206 || 9 || 116.5 || 
|-
| 115 ||  || 2164 || 9 || 107.0 || 
|-
| 116 ||  || 2217 || 8 || 141.0 || 
|-
| 117 ||  || 2115 || 8 || 139.0 || 
|-
| 118 ||  || 2128 || 8 || 138.0 || 
|-
| 119 ||  || 1849 || 8 || 137.5 || 
|-
| 120 ||  || 1669 || 8 || 135.0 || 
|-
| 121 ||  || 2007 || 8 || 130.5 || 
|-
| 122 ||  || 2260 || 8 || 127.5 || 
|-
| 123 ||  || 2111 || 8 || 127.0 || 
|-
| 124 ||  || 2230 || 8 || 125.0 || 
|-
| 125 ||  || 1200 || 8 || 121.5 || 
|-
| 126 ||  || 1891 || 8 || 112.0 || 
|-
| 127 ||  || 1435 || 8 || 104.0 || 
|-
| 128 ||  || 1691 || 8 || 100.0 || 
|-
| 129 ||  || 1967 || 8 || 83.0 || 
|-
| 130 ||  || 1927 || 8 || 69.5 || 
|-
| 131 ||  || 1200 || 7 || 112.5 || 
|-
| 132 ||  || 2120 || 7 || 110.0 || 
|-
| 133 ||  || 1992 || 7 || 108.5 || 
|-
| 134 ||  || 1853 || 7 || 103.0 || 
|-
| 135 ||  || 1438 || 7 || 102.0 || 
|-
| 136 ||  || 2049 || 7 || 80.5 || 
|-
| 137 ||  || 1200 || 7 || 78.5 || 
|-
| 138 ||  || 1496 || 7 || 70.5 || 
|-
| 139 ||  || 1619 || 6 || 98.0 || 
|-
| 140 ||  || 1530 || 6 || 81.0 || 15½
|-
| 141 ||  || 1940 || 6 || 81.0 || 14½
|-
| 142 ||  || 1200 || 6 || 74.0 || 
|-
| 143 ||  || 2058 || 6 || 70.0 || 
|-
| 144 ||  || 2038 || 6 || 50.5 || 
|-
| 145 ||  || 1200 || 4 || 45.5 || 
|-
| 146 ||  || 1321 || 3 || 57.0 || 
|-
| 147 ||  || 1200 || 3 || 32.5 || 
|-
| 148 ||  || 1604 || 2 ||  || 
|}

Group prizes
In addition to the overall medals, prizes were given out to the best teams in five different seeding groups—in other words, the teams who exceeded their seeding the most. Overall medal winners were not eligible for group prizes.

{| class="wikitable"
|+ Group Prizes
! Group !! Seedingrange !! Team !! MP !! dSB
|-
| A || 1–29 ||  || 17 || 355.5
|-
| B || 30–59 ||  || 15 || 307.5
|-
| C || 60–89 ||  || 13 || 227.0
|-
| D || 90–119 ||  || 11 || 187.5
|-
| E || 120–148 ||  || 13 || 202.5
|}

Individual medals

All board prizes were given out according to performance ratings. Sutovsky on the second board had the best performance of all players at the tournament:

 Board 1:  Vasyl Ivanchuk 2890
 Board 2:  Emil Sutovsky 2895
 Board 3:  Vitaly Teterev 2853
 Board 4:  Sergey Karjakin 2859
 Reserve:  Mateusz Bartel 2706

Women's event

The women's division was contested by 115 teams representing 110 nations. Russia, as hosts, fielded three teams, whilst the International Braille Chess Association (IBCA), the International Physically Disabled Chess Association (IPCA), and the International Committee of Silent Chess (ICSC) each provided one squad.

The Russians won by an impressive four points to take their first independent title in the post-Soviet era. The team was led by the two Kosintseva sisters, who both won their respective boards, while reigning World Champion Alexandra Kosteniuk "only" played third board and finished sixth.

China was captained by soon-to-be World Champion, 16-year-old Hou Yifan. They clinched the silver medals, another two points ahead of a field of six teams, of which defending champions Georgia had the best tie-break score and took the bronze.

The number one female player in the world, Judit Polgár, was absent from the women's competition. Instead she represented Hungary on third board in the open event, where she finished fourth both individually and with the team.

{| class="wikitable"
|+ Women's event
! # !! Country !! Players !! Averagerating !! MP !! dSB
|-
| style="background:gold;"|1 ||  || T. Kosintseva, N. Kosintseva, Kosteniuk, Galliamova, Gunina || 2536 || 22 || 
|-
| style="background:silver;"|2 ||  || Hou Yifan, Ju Wenjun, Zhao Xue, Huang Qian, Wang Yu || 2500 || 18 || 
|-
| style="background:#cc9966;"|3 ||  || Dzagnidze, Javakhishvili, Melia, Khukhashvili, Khotenashvili || 2472 || 16 || 384.0
|-
| 4 ||  || Ordaz Valdés, Linares Nápoles,Marrero Lopez, Pina Vega, Arribas Robaina || 2333 || 16 || 348.5
|-
| 5 ||  || Krush, Zatonskih, Abrahamyan, Baginskaite, Foisor || 2413 || 16 || 336.5
|-
| 6 ||  || Soćko, Zawadzka, Majdan-Gajewska, Dworakowska, Kądziołka || 2386 || 16 || 336.0
|-
| 7 ||  || Z. Mamedyarova, T. Mamedyarova, Mammadova, Umudova, Isgandarova || 2270 || 16 || 320.0
|-
| 8 ||  || Stefanova, Voiska, Nikolova, Videnova, Velcheva || 2361 || 16 || 296.5
|-
| 9 ||  || Lahno, Zhukova, Ushenina, Gaponenko, Muzychuk || 2493 || 15 || 366.5
|-
| 10 ||  "B" || Pogonina, Girya, Savina, Bodnaruk, Kashlinskaya || 2427 || 15 || 335.5
|}
{| class="wikitable collapsible collapsed"
! Rank !! Country !! Averagerating !! MP !! dSB !! GP !! dSMP
|+ class="nowrap" |Final Ranking - Women
|-
| 11 ||  || 2401 || 15 || 327.5 ||  || 
|-
| 12 ||  || 2306 || 15 || 316.0 ||  || 
|-
| 13 ||  || 2352 || 15 || 312.5 ||  || 
|-
| 14 ||  "C" || 2209 || 15 || 287.0 ||  || 
|-
| 15 ||  || 2398 || 14 || 320.5 ||  || 
|-
| 16 ||  || 2375 || 14 || 314.0 ||  || 
|-
| 17 ||  || 2400 || 14 || 313.5 ||  || 
|-
| 18 ||  || 2282 || 14 || 278.0 ||  || 
|-
| 19 ||  || 2252 || 14 || 276.0 ||  || 
|-
| 20 ||  || 2191 || 14 || 261.5 ||  || 
|-
| 21 ||  || 2195 || 14 || 257.5 || 27½ || 
|-
| 22 ||  || 2262 || 14 || 257.5 || 23½ || 
|-
| 23 ||  || 2210 || 14 || 246.5 ||  || 
|-
| 24 ||  || 2349 || 13 || 317.5 ||  || 
|-
| 25 ||  || 2344 || 13 || 313.5 ||  || 
|-
| 26 ||  || 2337 || 13 || 304.0 ||  || 
|-
| 27 ||  || 2290 || 13 || 290.0 ||  || 
|-
| 28 ||  || 2330 || 13 || 279.5 || 28½ || 
|-
| 29 ||  || 2196 || 13 || 279.5 || 27½ || 
|-
| 30 ||  || 2222 || 13 || 277.5 ||  || 
|-
| 31 ||  || 2293 || 13 || 263.5 ||  || 
|-
| 32 ||  || 2358 || 13 || 257.5 ||  || 
|-
| 33 ||  || 2168 || 13 || 255.0 ||  || 
|-
| 34 ||  || 2218 || 13 || 252.5 ||  || 
|-
| 35 ||  || 2259 || 13 || 249.5 ||  || 
|-
| 36 ||  || 2240 || 13 || 238.5 ||  || 
|-
| 37 ||  || 2191 || 12 || 266.5 ||  || 
|-
| 38 ||  || 2145 || 12 || 264.0 ||  || 
|-
| 39 ||  || 2272 || 12 || 258.0 ||  || 
|-
| 40 ||  || 2168 || 12 || 251.0 ||  || 
|-
| 41 ||  || 2100 || 12 || 244.5 ||  || 
|-
| 42 ||  || 2195 || 12 || 239.0 ||  || 
|-
| 43 ||  || 2144 || 12 || 236.0 ||  || 
|-
| 44 ||  || 2107 || 12 || 234.5 ||  || 
|-
| 45 ||  || 2057 || 12 || 200.5 ||  || 
|-
| 46 ||  || 2105 || 12 || 198.5 ||  || 
|-
| 47 ||  || 2105 || 12 || 191.0 ||  || 
|-
| 48 ||  || 2035 || 12 || 178.0 ||  || 
|-
| 49 ||  || 2167 || 11 || 251.5 ||  || 
|-
| 50 ||  || 2313 || 11 || 248.0 ||  || 
|-
| 51 ||  || 2229 || 11 || 247.0 ||  || 
|-
| 52 ||  || 2163 || 11 || 220.5 ||  || 
|-
| 53 ||  || 2166 || 11 || 204.0 ||  || 
|-
| 54 ||  || 2144 || 11 || 203.5 ||  || 
|-
| 55 ||  || 2228 || 11 || 203.0 ||  || 
|-
| 56 ||  || 1892 || 11 || 202.5 ||  || 
|-
| 57 ||  || 1968 || 11 || 201.0 ||  || 
|-
| 58 ||  || 2157 || 11 || 196.5 ||  || 
|-
| 59 || ICSC || 2113 || 11 || 193.0 ||  || 
|-
| 60 ||  || 1993 || 11 || 192.5 ||  || 
|-
| 61 ||  || 1713 || 11 || 184.5 ||  || 
|-
| 62 ||  || 1991 || 11 || 179.0 ||  || 
|-
| 63 ||  || 1921 || 11 || 160.0 ||  || 
|-
| 64 ||  || 1941 || 11 || 159.5 ||  || 
|-
| 65 ||  || 1970 || 11 || 155.0 ||  || 
|-
| 66 ||  || 2050 || 10 || 227.0 ||  || 
|-
| 67 ||  || 2054 || 10 || 217.0 ||  || 
|-
| 68 || IPCA || 1975 || 10 || 178.0 ||  || 
|-
| 69 ||  || 1952 || 10 || 175.0 ||  || 
|-
| 70 ||  || 2016 || 10 || 172.5 ||  || 
|-
| 71 ||  || 2071 || 10 || 166.0 ||  || 
|-
| 72 ||  || 1753 || 10 || 162.5 ||  || 
|-
| 73 ||  || 1970 || 10 || 159.5 ||  || 
|-
| 74 ||  || 2013 || 10 || 155.0 ||  || 
|-
| 75 ||  || 1820 || 10 || 147.5 ||  || 
|-
| 76 ||  || 1880 || 10 || 141.5 ||  || 
|-
| 77 ||  || 1882 || 10 || 136.5 ||  || 
|-
| 78 ||  || 1742 || 10 || 122.0 ||  || 
|-
| 79 ||  || 1779 || 9 || 169.0 || 20½ || 107
|-
| 80 || IBCA || 1803 || 9 || 169.0 || 20½ || 102
|-
| 81 ||  || 1982 || 9 || 168.0 ||  || 
|-
| 82 ||  || 1952 || 9 || 162.0 ||  || 
|-
| 83 ||  || 1401 || 9 || 160.5 ||  || 
|-
| 84 ||  || 1855 || 9 || 160.0 ||  || 
|-
| 85 ||  || 1947 || 9 || 158.0 ||  || 
|-
| 86 ||  || 1889 || 9 || 145.5 ||  || 
|-
| 87 ||  || 1568 || 9 || 118.0 || 17 || 
|-
| 88 ||  || 1375 || 9 || 118.0 || 16½ || 
|-
| 89 ||  || 1391 || 9 || 117.5 ||  || 
|-
| 90 ||  || 1958 || 9 || 115.5 ||  || 
|-
| 91 ||  || 1862 || 8 || 158.0 ||  || 
|-
| 92 ||  || 1714 || 8 || 135.0 ||  || 
|-
| 93 ||  || 1529 || 8 || 128.5 ||  || 
|-
| 94 ||  || 1555 || 8 || 122.0 ||  || 
|-
| 95 ||  || 1200 || 8 || 119.0 ||  || 
|-
| 96 ||  || 1636 || 8 || 111.0 ||  || 
|-
| 97 ||  || 1732 || 8 || 109.0 ||  || 
|-
| 98 ||  || 1694 || 8 || 90.5 ||  || 
|-
| 99 ||  || 1361 || 8 || 79.0 ||  || 
|-
| 100 ||  || 1893 || 7 || 139.0 ||  || 
|-
| 101 ||  || 1200 || 7 || 125.0 ||  || 
|-
| 102 ||  || 1376 || 7 || 110.0 ||  || 
|-
| 103 ||  || 1252 || 7 || 100.5 ||  || 
|-
| 104 ||  || 1425 || 7 || 86.5 ||  || 
|-
| 105 ||  || 1200 || 7 || 84.5 ||  || 
|-
| 106 ||  || 1377 || 7 || 80.5 ||  || 
|-
| 107 ||  || 1200 || 7 || 45.0 ||  || 
|-
| 108 ||  || 1200 || 6 || 79.5 ||  || 
|-
| 109 ||  || 1349 || 6 || 79.0 ||  || 
|-
| 110 ||  || 1200 || 6 || 70.5 ||  || 
|-
| 111 ||  || 1200 || 6 || 70.0 ||  || 
|-
| 112 ||  || 1331 || 6 || 66.0 ||  || 
|-
| 113 ||  || 1506 || 6 || 64.0 ||  || 
|-
| 114 ||  || 1441 || 6 || 61.5 ||  || 
|-
| 115 ||  || 1200 || 1 ||  ||  || 
|}

Individual medals

All board prizes were given out according to performance ratings. Gaponenko on the fourth board had the best performance of all players at the tournament:

 Board 1:  Tatiana Kosintseva 2628
 Board 2:  Nadezhda Kosintseva 2662
 Board 3:  Yaniet Marrero Lopez 2511
 Board 4:  Inna Gaponenko 2691
 Reserve:  Mariya Muzychuk 2431

Overall title

The Nona Gaprindashvili Trophy is awarded to the nation that has the highest toal number of match points in the open and women's divisions combined. Where two or more teams are tied, they are ordered by the same tie breakers as in the two separate events.

The trophy, named after the former women's World Champion (1961–78), was created by FIDE in 1997.

FIDE presidential election

During the Olympiad, Kirsan Ilyumzhinov was re-elected as President of FIDE, defeating his rival, former World Champion Anatoly Karpov, decisively by 95 votes to 55.

Controversies

In the first round, the team from Yemen refused to play against Israel. Each of the four Israeli players was thus awarded a technical victory.

Three French players were caught in a scheme to use a computer program to decide moves. Their plan involved one player, Cyril Marzolo (IM), following the tournament at home and using the computer program to decide the best moves. He would send the moves by text message to the captain of the French team, Arnaud Hauchard (GM), who would then stand or sit at various tables as a signal to the player Sébastien Feller (GM) to make a certain move. Feller and Marzolo were given five year suspensions for this, while Hauchard was given a lifetime suspension. None of the other players on the French team knew of this or were involved.

Notes

External links
39th Chess Olympiad: Khanty-Mansiysk 2010 OlimpBase
Official site
Chess Olympiad 2010 details
Venue 
Open section
Women's section

Chess Olympiads
Women's Chess Olympiads
Chess in Russia
Olympiad
Chess Olympiad
Sport in Khanty-Mansiysk